Oleg Nikolayevich Kozhemyako, born 17 March 1962, is the Governor of Primorsky Krai since  2018. Previously he was the Governor of Sakhalin Oblast, Russia. President Vladimir Putin appointed him to the position on March 25, 2015 to replace former Governor Alexander Khoroshavin who was arrested and charged with accepting bribes. Previously, Kozhemyako served two terms as Governor of Amur Oblast and one term as the Head of Koryak Autonomous Okrug.

Kozhemyako was appointed representative of the Primorsky Krai Legislative Assembly in the Federation Council in 2002. Then, he was elected as the Head of Koryak Autonomous Okrug on April 15, 2005, and held it until the okrug merged with Kamchatka Oblast on June 30, 2007.  On October 16, 2008, President Dmitry Medvedev appointed him to the Amur governorship to replace Nikolai Kolesov. On October 14, 2012, after direct elections of governors were restored, Kozhemyako run for re-election. He was re-elected, collecting over 76% of the votes.

On December 16, 2018 he won the recall election of the Governor of Primorsky Krai.

In May 2022, Oleg Kozhemyako was included in the Myrotvorets Ukrainian database.

References

1962 births
Living people
Governors of Amur Oblast
Governors of Koryak Autonomous Okrug
Governors of Sakhalin Oblast
United Russia politicians
21st-century Russian politicians
Members of the Federation Council of Russia (after 2000)
Governors of Primorsky Krai